Angerapp can refer to the German name of: 

Angrapa, a river that begins in northeastern Poland and ends in the Kaliningrad Oblast
Darkehmen district, former administrative district in East Prussia
Ozyorsk, Kaliningrad Oblast, town in the Kaliningrad Oblast
Rapa, Poland, village in Poland